Für is a Hungarian surname. Notable people with the surname include:

Anikó Für (born 1964), Hungarian actress
Lajos Für (1930–2013), Hungarian politician and historian

Hungarian-language surnames